Robert Philip Hanssen (born April 18, 1944) is an American former Federal Bureau of Investigation (FBI) double agent who spied for Soviet and Russian intelligence services against the United States from 1979 to 2001. His espionage was described by the U.S. Department of Justice as "possibly the worst intelligence disaster in U.S. history." Hanssen is currently serving 15 consecutive life sentences without parole at ADX Florence, a federal supermax prison near Florence, Colorado.

In 1979, three years after joining the FBI, Hanssen approached the Soviet Main Intelligence Directorate (GRU) to offer his services, beginning his first espionage cycle, lasting until 1981. He restarted his espionage activities in 1985 and continued until 1991, when he ended communications during the collapse of the Soviet Union, fearing he would be exposed. Hanssen restarted communications the next year and continued until his arrest. Throughout his spying, Hanssen remained anonymous to the Russians.

Hanssen sold thousands of classified documents to the KGB that detailed U.S. strategies in the event of nuclear war, developments in military weapons technologies, and aspects of the U.S. counterintelligence program. He was spying at the same time as Aldrich Ames in the Central Intelligence Agency (CIA). Both Ames and Hanssen compromised the names of KGB agents working secretly for the U.S., some of whom were executed for their betrayal. Hanssen also revealed a multimillion-dollar eavesdropping tunnel built by the FBI under the Soviet Embassy. After Ames's arrest in 1994, some of these intelligence breaches remained unsolved. The FBI paid $7 million to a KGB agent to obtain a file on an anonymous mole, whom the FBI later identified as Hanssen through fingerprint and voice analysis.

Hanssen was arrested on February 18, 2001, at Foxstone Park, near his home in the Washington, D.C., suburb of Vienna, Virginia, after leaving a package of classified materials at a dead drop site. He was charged with selling U.S. intelligence documents to the Soviet Union and subsequently Russia for more than $1.4 million in cash and diamonds over 22 years. To avoid the death penalty, Hanssen pleaded guilty to 14 counts of espionage and one of conspiracy to commit espionage. He was sentenced to 15 life terms without the possibility of parole.

Early life
Robert Hanssen was born in Chicago, Illinois, to a Lutheran family who lived in the Norwood Park neighborhood. He is of Norwegian descent. His father, Howard, a Chicago police officer, was allegedly emotionally abusive to Hanssen during his childhood. He graduated from William Howard Taft High School in 1962 and then attended Knox College in Galesburg, Illinois, where he earned a bachelor's degree in chemistry in 1966.

Hanssen applied for a cryptographer job in the National Security Agency but was rebuffed due to budget setbacks. He enrolled in dental school at Northwestern University but switched his focus to business after three years. Hanssen received an MBA in accounting and information systems in 1971 and took a job with an accounting firm. He quit after one year and joined the Chicago Police Department as an internal affairs investigator, specializing in forensic accounting. In January 1976, he left the police department to join the Federal Bureau of Investigation (FBI).

Hanssen met Bernadette "Bonnie" Wauck, a staunch Roman Catholic, while attending dental school at Northwestern. The couple married in 1968, and Hanssen converted from Lutheranism to his wife's Catholicism. Hanssen later joined the Catholic organization Opus Dei with like-minded individuals.

FBI career and first espionage activities (1976–1981)
Upon becoming a special agent on January 12, 1976, Hanssen was transferred to the FBI's Gary, Indiana, field office. In 1978, he and his growing family of three children (and eventually six) relocated to New York City when the FBI transferred him to its field office there. The next year, Hanssen was transferred to counterintelligence and given the task of compiling a database of Soviet intelligence for the FBI.

In 1979, Hanssen approached the Soviet Main Intelligence Directorate (GRU) and offered his services. He never indicated any political or ideological motive for his actions, telling the FBI after he was caught that his only motivation was financial. During his first espionage cycle, Hanssen provided a significant amount of information to the GRU, including details of the FBI's bugging activities and lists of suspected Soviet intelligence agents. His most important leak was the betrayal of Dmitri Polyakov, a CIA informant who passed enormous amounts of information to U.S. intelligence while rising to the rank of general in the Soviet Army. For unknown reasons, the Soviets did not act against Polyakov until he was betrayed a second time by CIA mole Aldrich Ames in 1985. Polyakov was arrested in 1986 and executed in 1988. Ames was officially blamed for giving Polyakov's name to the Soviets, while Hanssen's attempt was not revealed until after his 2001 capture. CIA and FBI officials, including Deputy Director William Sullivan, believed that, at some point, Polyakov was made into a triple agent by the Soviets, who thereby deceived the West with misinformation.

FBI counterintelligence unit, further espionage activities (1985–1991)

In 1981, Hanssen was transferred to FBI headquarters in Washington, D.C., and he relocated to the suburb of Vienna, Virginia. His new job in the FBI's budget office gave him access to information involving many different FBI operations. This included all the FBI activities related to wiretapping and electronic surveillance, which were Hanssen's responsibility. He became known in the FBI as an expert on computers.

Three years later, Hanssen transferred to the FBI's Soviet analytical unit, responsible for studying, identifying, and capturing Soviet spies and intelligence operatives in the United States. Hanssen's section evaluated Soviet agents who volunteered to give intelligence to determine whether they were genuine or re-doubled agents. In 1985, Hanssen was again transferred to the FBI's field office in New York, where he continued to work in counterintelligence against the Soviets. After the transfer, while on a business visit back to Washington, D.C., he resumed his espionage career.

On October 1, 1985, Hanssen sent an anonymous letter to the KGB offering his services and asking for $100,000 in cash, . In the letter, he gave the names of three KGB agents secretly working for the FBI: Boris Yuzhin, Valery Martynov, and Sergei Motorin. Although Hanssen was unaware of it, Ames had already exposed all three agents earlier that year. Yuzhin had returned to Moscow in 1982 and had been subject to an intensive investigation by the KGB there due to having lost a concealed camera in the Soviet consulate in San Francisco, but he was not arrested until being exposed by Ames and Hanssen. Martynov and Motorin were recalled to Moscow, where they were arrested, charged, tried, and convicted of espionage against the Soviet government. Martynov and Motorin were condemned to death and executed via a gunshot to the back of the head. Yuzhin was imprisoned for six years before he was released by a general amnesty to political prisoners, and subsequently immigrated to the U.S.. Because the FBI blamed Ames for the leak, Hanssen was neither suspected nor investigated. The October 1 letter began a long, active espionage period for Hanssen.

Hanssen was recalled yet again to Washington, D.C., in 1987. He was tasked with studying all known and rumored penetrations of the FBI to find the man who had betrayed Martynov and Motorin; this meant, in effect, that he was charged with searching for himself. Hanssen ensured that he did not reveal himself with his study, but in addition, he gave the entire study—including the list of all Soviets who had contacted the FBI about FBI moles—to the KGB in 1988. That same year, Hanssen, according to a government report, committed a "serious security breach" by revealing secret information to a Soviet defector during a debriefing. The agents working for him reported this breach to a supervisor, but no action was taken.

In 1989, Hanssen compromised the FBI investigation of Felix Bloch, a Department of State official who had become suspected of espionage. Hanssen warned the KGB that Bloch was being investigated, causing the KGB to end contact with him abruptly. The FBI could not produce any good evidence, and as a result, Bloch was never charged with a crime, although the State Department later terminated his employment and denied his pension. The failure of the Bloch investigation and the FBI's investigation of how the KGB learned that they were investigating Bloch caused the mole hunt that eventually resulted in the arrest of Hanssen.

Later that year, Hanssen gave extensive information about American planning for measurement and signature intelligence (MASINT), a general term for intelligence collected by a variety of electronic means, such as radar, spy satellites, and signal intercepts. When the Soviets began construction on a new embassy during 1977, the FBI dug a tunnel beneath their decoding room. The FBI planned to use it for eavesdropping but never did for fear of being caught. Hanssen disclosed this information to the Soviets in September 1989 and received a $55,000 payment the next month, . On two occasions, Hanssen gave the Soviets a complete list of American double agents.

In 1990, Hanssen's brother-in-law, Mark Wauck, who was also an FBI employee, recommended to the FBI that Hanssen be investigated for espionage because his sister, Hanssen's wife, told him that her sister, Jeanne Beglis, had found a pile of cash on a dresser in the Hanssens' house. Bonnie had previously told her brother that Hanssen once talked about retiring in Poland, then part of the Eastern Bloc. Wauck also knew that the FBI was hunting for a mole and spoke with his supervisor, who took no action.

Later FBI career, continued espionage activities (1992–2001)
When the USSR disbanded in December 1991, Hanssen, possibly worried that he could be exposed during the ensuing political upheaval, ended communications with his handlers for a time. The following year, after the Russian Federation assumed control of the defunct Soviet spy agencies, Hanssen made a risky approach to the GRU, with whom he had not been in contact in ten months. He went to the Russian embassy in person and physically approached a GRU officer in the parking garage. Hanssen, carrying a package of documents, identified himself by his Soviet code name, "Ramon Garcia", and described himself as a "disaffected FBI agent" who was offering his services as a spy. The Russian officer, who evidently did not recognize the code name, drove away. The Russians then filed an official protest with the State Department, believing Hanssen to be a triple agent. Despite having shown his face, disclosed his code name, and revealed his FBI affiliation, Hanssen escaped arrest when the FBI's investigation into the incident did not advance.

Hanssen continued to take risks in 1993 when he hacked into the computer of a fellow FBI agent, Ray Mislock, printed out a classified document from Mislock's computer and took the document to Mislock, saying, "You didn't believe me that the system was insecure." Hanssen's superiors were not amused and began an investigation. In the end, officials believed his claim that he was merely demonstrating flaws in the FBI's security system. Mislock has since theorized that Hanssen probably went onto his computer to see if his superiors were investigating him for espionage and invented the document story to cover his tracks.

In 1994, Hanssen expressed interest in a transfer to the new National Counterintelligence Center, which coordinated counterintelligence activities. When told that he would have to take a lie detector test to join, Hanssen changed his mind. Three years later, convicted FBI mole Earl Edwin Pitts told the FBI that he suspected Hanssen due to the Mislock incident. Pitts was the second FBI agent to mention Hanssen by name as a possible mole, but superiors were still unconvinced, and no action was taken.

IT personnel from the National Security Division's IIS Unit were sent to investigate Hanssen's desktop computer after a reported failure. NSD chief Johnnie Sullivan ordered the computer impounded after it seemed to have been tampered with. A digital investigation found that an attempted hacking had occurred using a password cracking program installed by Hanssen, which caused a security alert and lockup. After confirmation by the FBI CART Unit, Sullivan filed a report with the Office of Professional Responsibility requesting the further investigation of Hanssen's attempted hack. Hanssen claimed he was trying to connect a color printer to his computer but needed the password cracker to bypass the administrative password. The FBI believed his story, and Hanssen was merely given a warning.

During the same period, Hanssen searched the FBI's internal computer case record to see if he was being investigated. He was indiscreet enough to type his name into FBI search engines. Finding nothing, Hanssen decided to resume his spy career after eight years without contact with the Russians. He established contact with the SVR (the successor to the Soviet-era KGB) during the autumn of 1999. He continued to perform incriminating searches of FBI files for his name and address.

Investigation and arrest
The existence of two Russian moles working in the U.S. security and intelligence establishment simultaneously—Ames at the CIA and Hanssen at the FBI—complicated counterintelligence efforts during the 1990s. Ames was arrested in 1994. His exposure explained many of the asset losses U.S. intelligence suffered during the 1980s, including the arrest and execution of Martynov and Motorin. However, two cases—- the Bloch investigation and the embassy tunnel—- remained unsolved. Ames had been stationed in Rome at the time of the Bloch investigation and could not have known about that case or the tunnel under the embassy, as he did not work for the FBI.

The FBI and CIA formed a joint mole-hunting team in 1994 to find the suspected second intelligence leak. They created a list of all agents known to have access to cases that were compromised. The FBI's codename for the suspected spy was "Graysuit". Some promising suspects were cleared, and the mole hunt found other penetrations, such as CIA officer Harold James Nicholson. However, Hanssen escaped notice, likely because these efforts concentrated on CIA agents rather than FBI agents. The idea that an FBI agent was the second mole was not considered early enough.

By 1998, using FBI criminal profiling techniques, the pursuers suspected an innocent man: Brian Kelley, a CIA operative involved in the Bloch investigation. The CIA and FBI searched his house, tapped his telephone, and surveilled him, following him and his family everywhere. In November 1998, they had a man with a foreign accent come to Kelley's door, warn him that the FBI knew he was a spy, and tell him to show up at a Metro station the next day to escape. Kelley instead reported the incident to the FBI. In 1999, the FBI even interrogated Kelley, his ex-wife, two sisters, and three children. All denied everything. He was eventually placed on administrative leave, where he remained falsely accused until after Hanssen was arrested.

FBI investigators later made progress during an operation where they paid disaffected Russian intelligence officers to deliver information on moles. They paid $7 million to KGB agent Alexandr Shcherbakov who had access to a file on "B". While it did not contain Hanssen's name, among the information was an audiotape of a July 21, 1986, conversation between "B" and KGB agent Aleksander Fefelov. FBI agent Michael Waguespack thought the voice was familiar, but could not remember who it was. Rifling through the rest of the files, they found notes of the mole using a quote from General George S. Patton about "the purple-pissing Japanese". FBI analyst Bob King remembered Hanssen using that same quote. Waguespack listened to the tape again and recognized the voice as belonging to Hanssen. With the mole finally identified, locations, dates, and cases were matched with Hanssen's activities during the period. Two fingerprints collected from a trash bag in the file were analyzed and proved to be Hanssen's.

The FBI surveilled Hanssen and soon discovered he was again in contact with the Russians. To bring him back to FBI headquarters, where he could be closely monitored and kept away from sensitive data, they promoted him in December 2000. They gave him a new job supervising FBI computer security. In January 2001, Hanssen was given an office and an assistant, Eric O'Neill, who, in reality, was a young FBI surveillance specialist who had been assigned to watch Hanssen. O'Neill ascertained that Hanssen was using a Palm III PDA to store his information. When O'Neill could briefly obtain Hanssen's PDA and have agents download and decode its encrypted contents, the FBI had decisive evidence.

During his final days with the FBI, Hanssen began to suspect something was wrong. In early February 2001, he asked his friend at a computer technology company for a job. He also believed he heard noises on his car radio that indicated it was bugged, although the FBI was later unable to reproduce the noises Hanssen claimed to have heard. In the last letter he wrote to the Russians, which was found by the FBI when he was arrested, Hanssen said that he had been promoted to a "do-nothing job ... outside of regular access to information," and that, "Something has aroused the sleeping tiger".

However, Hanssen's suspicions did not stop him from making one more dead drop. After leaving a friend at an airport on February 18, 2001, Hanssen drove to Virginia's Foxstone Park. He placed a white piece of tape on a park sign, which was a signal to his Russian contacts that there was information at the dead drop site. He then followed his usual routine, taking a package consisting of a sealed garbage bag of classified material and taping it to the bottom side of a wooden footbridge over a creek. When FBI agents observed this incriminating act, they rushed in to arrest Hanssen. Upon being arrested, Hanssen asked, "What took you so long?" The FBI waited two more days to see if any of Hanssen's SVR handlers would show up at Foxstone Park. When they failed to appear, the Justice Department announced the arrest on February 20.

Guilty plea and imprisonment

With the representation of Washington lawyer Plato Cacheris, Hanssen negotiated a plea bargain that enabled him to avoid the death penalty in exchange for cooperating with authorities. On July 6, 2001, he pleaded guilty to 13 counts of espionage, one count of attempted espionage, and one of conspiracy to commit espionage in the U.S. District Court for the Eastern District of Virginia. On May 10, 2002, Hanssen was sentenced to 15 consecutive sentences of life in prison without the possibility of parole. "I apologize for my behavior. I am shamed by it," Hanssen told U.S. District Judge Claude Hilton. "I have opened the door for calumny against my totally innocent wife and children. I have hurt so many deeply."

Hanssen is Federal Bureau of Prisons prisoner #48551-083. He is serving his sentence at the ADX Florence, a federal supermax prison near Florence, Colorado, in solitary confinement for 23 hours a day.

Modus operandi
Hanssen never told the KGB or GRU his identity and refused to meet them personally, except for the abortive 1993 contact in the Russian embassy parking garage. The FBI believes that the Russians never knew the name of their source. Going by the alias "Ramon" or "Ramon Garcia", Hanssen exchanged intelligence and payments through an old-fashioned dead drop system in which he and his KGB handlers left packages in public, unobtrusive places. He refused to use the dead drop sites that his handler, Victor Cherkashin, suggested and instead chose his own. He also designated a code to be used when dates were exchanged. Six was to be added to the month, day, and time of a designated drop time, so that, for example, a drop scheduled for January 6 at 1:00p.m. would be written as July 12 at 7:00p.m..

Despite these efforts at caution and security, Hanssen could sometimes be reckless. He once said in a letter to the KGB that it should emulate the management style of Mayor of Chicago Richard J. Daley—a comment that easily could have led an investigator to look at people from Chicago. Hanssen took the risk of recommending to his handlers that they try to recruit his closest friend, a colonel in the United States Army.

Personal life
According to USA Today, those who knew the Hanssens described them as a close family. They attended Mass weekly and were very active in Opus Dei. Hanssen's three sons attended The Heights School in Potomac, Maryland, an all-boys preparatory school. His three daughters attended Oakcrest School for Girls in Vienna, Virginia, an independent Roman Catholic school. Both schools are associated with Opus Dei. Hanssen's wife, Bonnie, retired from teaching theology at Oakcrest in 2020.

A priest at Oakcrest said Hanssen had regularly attended a 6:30 a.m. daily Mass for over a decade. Opus Dei member C. John McCloskey said he also occasionally attended the daily noontime Mass at the Catholic Information Center in downtown Washington. After being imprisoned, Hanssen claimed he periodically admitted his espionage to priests in confession. He urged fellow Catholics in the FBI to attend Mass more often and denounced the Russians as "godless", even though he had been spying for them.

At Hanssen's suggestion, and without his wife's knowledge, a friend named Jack Hoschouer, a retired Army officer, would sometimes watch the Hanssens having sex through a bedroom window. Hanssen then began to videotape his sexual encounters secretly and shared the videotapes with Hoschouer. Later, he hid a video camera in the bedroom connected via a closed-circuit television line so that Hoschouer could observe the Hanssens from his guest bedroom. He also explicitly described the sexual details of his marriage on Internet chat rooms, giving information sufficient for those who knew them to recognize the couple.

Hanssen frequently visited D.C. strip clubs and spent a great deal of time with a Washington stripper named Priscilla Sue Galey. She went with Hanssen on visits to Hong Kong and the FBI training facility in Quantico, Virginia. Hanssen gave her money, jewels, and a used Mercedes-Benz but ended contact with her before his arrest when she began abusing drugs and doing sex work. Galey claims that although she offered to have sex with him, Hanssen declined, saying he was trying to convert her to Catholicism.

In the media
The Hanssen spy case is told in Ronald Kessler's book The Secrets of the FBI in chapter 15, "Catching Hanssen," chapter 16, "Breach", and chapter 17, "Unexplained Cash", based in part on interviews with Michael Rochford, who directed the FBI team that eventually caught Hanssen after initially wrongly assuming a CIA officer was the master spy.

Hanssen was the subject of a 2002 made-for-television movie, Master Spy: The Robert Hanssen Story, with the teleplay by Norman Mailer and starring William Hurt as Hanssen. Hanssen's jailers allowed him to watch this movie, but he was so angered by it that he turned it off.

Eric O'Neill's role in the capture of Robert Hanssen was dramatized in the 2007 movie Breach, in which Chris Cooper played the role of Hanssen and Ryan Phillippe played O'Neill.

The 2007 documentary Superspy: The Man Who Betrayed the West describes the hunt to trap Hanssen.

Hanssen is mentioned in chapter 5 of Dan Brown's book The Da Vinci Code as the most noted Opus Dei member to non-members. Because of his sexual deviancy and espionage conviction, the organization's reputation was badly hurt.

The American Court TV (now TruTV) television series Mugshots released an episode on the Robert Hanssen case titled "Robert Hanssen – Hanssen and the KGB".

The investigation is covered in O'Neill's memoir Gray Day: My Undercover Mission to Expose America's First Cyber Spy, published by Penguin Random House in the spring of 2019. David Wise wrote Spy: The Inside Story of How the FBI's Robert Hanssen Betrayed America.

Hanssen's story was featured in episode 4, under the name of "Perfect Traitor", of Smithsonian Channel's series Spy Wars, aired end of 2019 and narrated by Damian Lewis.

Hanssen is mentioned in the seventh episode of The History Channel series America's Book of Secrets, as well as in the fifth episode of Netflix series Spycraft.

Hanssen's story is the subject of the 2021 documentary A Spy in the FBI.

Notes

References and further reading

 
 ; PDF Version  (Archive)

External links

 Robert Philip Hanssen Espionage Case – FBI
 FBI application for arrest warrant for Hanssen (Archive)
 
 Archived at Ghostarchive and the Wayback Machine: 
 Archived at Ghostarchive and the Wayback Machine: 

1944 births
20th-century criminals
American people convicted of spying for the Soviet Union
American people of Norwegian descent
American prisoners sentenced to life imprisonment
American spies for the Soviet Union
American people convicted of spying for Russia
Chicago Police Department officers
Converts to Roman Catholicism from Lutheranism
Double agents
Espionage in the United States
Federal Bureau of Investigation agents convicted of crimes
Federal Bureau of Investigation agents convicted of espionage
Incarcerated spies
Inmates of ADX Florence
Knox College (Illinois) alumni
Living people
Kellogg School of Management alumni
Opus Dei members
People from Chicago
People from Vienna, Virginia
People convicted under the Espionage Act of 1917
Prisoners sentenced to life imprisonment by the United States federal government
Catholics from Virginia
Catholics from Illinois
Soviet spies
Admitted Soviet spies